This is a list of characters for the manga and anime series Kaiji.

Kaiji Itō

 is a young man, who after graduating from high school he moves to Tokyo to get a job, but ends up spending his days gambling, drinking cheap booze and getting rid of his gloom by vandalizing illegally parked expensive cars. When Endō invites him to go on the gambling ship Espoir in order to repay the debt of an acquaintance from his part-time job, he enters the world of dangerous gambling.

Because he is lazy, self-indulgent and does not think about his "goal in life" at all, he is called "human scum" by Sakazaki when he finds himself in a peaceful environment. Since high school, being late has been a common occurrence, and he has been immersed in pachinko and pachislot machines, as well as buying dubious strategy guides, upsetting his mother. However, when he is put in an extreme situation where his life is at stake, he shows extraordinary courage, resourcefulness, and insight, and fights his way through the gambling hell with logical thinking and genius while having a "win because you must" mentality. He is described by Ishida as "a man who can get up at the last minute" and "a man who can win," and he has the vitality to beat powerful opponents such as Tonegawa and Hyōdō without hesitation. He would never betray a person he trusts under any circumstances, but conversely, he has been betrayed many times by people he trusted, and this has made him bitter each time. For this reason, he often talks about needing to dismiss others to survive, but he nevertheless tries to save those who have been cornered, even if it means killing off any chance at gain and profit for himself, which could be viewed as kindhearted by some and naive by others. However, at the beginning of Tobaku Hakairoku Kaiji, he admits that he cannot take action unless he is in "extreme conditions," and as a result of contacting Endō for more dangerous gambling, he is thrown into the underground kingdom, and even after escaping it, he returns to self-indulgence and craves dangerous games deep down.

While he is addicted to gambling, he is known as a legendary gambler by those who know of his divine feats, and has made a bit of a name for himself in the underworld. In addition, whether by chance or necessity, there is Teiai involved in every match, and every time he fights to the death, he is keenly aware of this inseparable connection.

Teiai Group

Yūji Endō

, on the surface, is the president of Endō Finance, which is part of the Teiai Group, but in reality, he is a rogue yakuza who lends money with an absurd interest rate (crow money). He is the one who invited Kaiji into the underworld, first appearing before Kaiji to collect a debt he had shrugged off from a friend and luring him to the gambling ship Espoir. Four months later, he reappears to take Kaiji and Sahara to the Starside Hotel. Within the Teiai group, he belonged to Tonegawa's faction, but when Tonegawa lost his job, he himself fell into complete decline and was forced out of his main job. Afterwards, he sent Kaiji, who was seeking more gambling and still saddled with a debt that had grown to nearly 10 million, to the underground labor facility in accordance with Teiai's rule that there are no second chances.

When Kaiji is released, he goes to Endō again for a loan to get enough money to beat the Bog, and during the battle he loans Kaiji another 10 million that he had planned to use for a last-minute escape plan. While he was enjoying the party with Kaiji and Sakazaki at the hotel after beating the Bog, he gave them a tasteless and odorless sleeping pill. In the end, he reveals that the money he loaned to Kaiji had an exorbitant interest rate of 30% compounded every 10 minutes, and runs away with his subordinates after taking 100 million from Kaiji's share. However, some camaraderie seemed to have formed between them, as he remembered the moment of victory and did not take more interest than what was stated, nor did he mess with Sakazaki's share or drag out the compound interest time until it was time to split the share. Before disappearing from Kaiji's presence with his men, he muttered in his mind, "I'll never see you again". Despite that vicious act, since Kaiji signed the loan agreement and Endō merely did his job as a financing company president, he is the only one who does not come to mind when Kaiji thinks of the people who betrayed him in the past, despite Kaiji referring to him as a "reaper" on one occasion.

In 2.4 Billion Escape Arc, Endō works for Teiai by Kurosaki's orders. His current position is head of the Kaiji-Chang-Mario manhunt headquarters. For this reason, he is called "General Manager Endō" by his subordinates.

In the live-action adaptation, he is changed to a woman named Rinko Endō, who is the head of a faction in the Teiai Group that is at odds with Tonegawa. She loses the competition with Tonegawa and gets kicked off the career path, but she loans 50 million yen to Kaiji, who has spent all of his war funds on the E-Card battle. When Kaiji wins against Tonegawa, they win a huge amount of 250 million yen. In addition, just like in the original manga, the interest rate of 30% compounded by 10 minutes and the cost of repairing the car that was damaged by Kaiji had cost Kaiji most of his share, and as a result, she and her subordinates left the Teiai Group with about 500 million yen on hand.

Yukio Tonegawa

 is one of the top executives of the Teiai Group. He becomes Kaiji's arch-enemy for almost the entirety of Tobaku Mokushiroku Kaiji. Managing the "Restricted RPS" at the gambling ship Espoir and the "Steel Beam Crossing (Human Derby and Electrified Steel Beam Crossing)" at the Starside Hotel, he scolds the debtors and lures them to life-threatening gambles by making use of harsh and skillful speeches that could be considered mantras that strike at the essence of society by some and sophistry on the part of the gambling game organizers by others. He is a fierce and resourceful fighter who has been successful for many years, and because of this, he looks down on the debtors and is cruel to the point that their deaths do not trouble him in the slightest. He is defeated by Kaiji in the final match of E-Card due to Kaiji's brilliant plan to attack Tonegawa's weakness (he is too brilliant to doubt his own judgment), and although he won more times than Kaiji, Kaiji was able to reach his target amount of 20 million yen. This provoked the wrath of Hyōdō, who forced him to undergo the Grilling Grovel on a burnt iron plate for ten seconds. There has never been a person who was able to kneel on the plate for 10 full seconds on his own, but as he declared that he would not borrow anyone's help, Tonegawa endured 12.47 seconds (12.24 seconds in the anime) by himself, displaying his determination and dignity in the end. His current whereabouts are unknown, except that he has completely lost his position within the Teiai Group, but on the "Trajectory of Kaiji" page of the first volume of Tobaku Hakairoku Kaiji, it is stated that he became essentially disabled. Endō was of the opinion that Tonegawa, not Kurosaki, might have been in the Teiai No. 2 spot if he had not been disgraced by Kaiji. Although he has not appeared directly in the story since the E-Card battle, he, along with Hyōdō, is etched in Kaiji's mind as a demonic and fierce man, while also a noble man who persevered through hell, appearing occasionally in photographs and flashbacks.

He is the main character of the spin-off series Mr. Tonegawa: Middle Management Blues that takes place before the events of Kaiji, where his suffering as a middle manager is more comically depicted.

In the live-action adaptation, he is younger than in the original manga, and is defeated by Kaiji with an E-Card in the first film just like the original. He appears again in the second movie with a much bigger role, taking over Endō's role as Kaiji's collaborator in beating the Bog so he can get back to his former position. After beating the Bog, he challenges Kaiji with another game of handmade E-Card but it is all a hoax, and by making it look like both of their shares burned in the fire, he steals Kaiji's share (though he handed over some 50,000 yen for the victory party Kaiji and his friends have after being freed from the underground). In the last scene, he stares at Kaiji from inside the car as he is hoisted up after the victory party, and shows his envy at Kaiji being surrounded by his friends.

Kazutaka Hyōdō

 is the leader of the Teiai Group and Kaiji's nemesis throughout the entire first arc. He is called "Chairman" by his subordinates. A money-grabber who has huge assets and continuously craves for more, he is constantly collecting money from all over the world to build a "kingdom" with Teiai, and takes it very seriously that money will become worthless once society collapses, wishing to be able to live in luxury even if there is a nuclear war. He is also a sadist and takes great pleasure in observing insane gambles and watching people suffer. He does not hesitate, and even takes great delight in extorting the weak through profit, forcing those who have lost in gambling games to destroy their organs, cut off their fingers, burn themselves on the ground, or perform underground forced labor, as well as sending debtors who cannot pay back their debts to their deaths. He also has a sharp mind for his age, and despite his brutal, monstrous and abominable persona, he has a fair side to him, even if it may put him at a disadvantage during a game. Occasionally, he is portrayed as possessing a somewhat extreme but genuine sense of ethics, such as watching his son Kazuya as a child playing Pop-up Pirate and wondering deep down if he should give his child a "game of stabbing people." He also has a certain amount of appreciation for Kaiji's character, which he describes as "out of step with the ordinary," but at its core, he treats Kaiji like an insect, and, by his own admission, he is obsessed with watching his downfall.

He makes his first appearance in silhouette at the end of the first arc, "The Ship of Hope". In the final phase of the second chapter, "The Castle of Despair", he confronted Kaiji directly in the "Tissue Box Lottery," and showed why he is the king of kings. In subsequent arcs, Hyōdō and Teiai continue to stand in the way of Kaiji's fate. He and his foreign wife Sophie have two children, Kazuki and Kazuya.

In the spin-off Mr. Tonegawa: Middle Management Blues, he is portrayed as an incoherent person who brandishes his subordinate Tonegawa at every opportunity. The spin-off 1-nichi Gaishutsuroku Hanchō also shows how his petty moods affect the workers in the underground facility.

Tobaku Mokushiroku Kaiji

Takeshi Furuhata

 is a debtor and one-time coworker of Kaiji, Furuhata is the one who initiated Kaiji's entry into the underworld. He is timid and easily influenced by others. A debt collector encouraged him to make Kaiji his cosigner and he disappears, but is eventually reunited with Kaiji on the Espoir and they fight through the Restricted Rock-paper-scissors gamble together. Eventually, though Andō incited him to betray Kaiji, both of them are punished by the resurrected Kaiji and lose their surplus stars and money. In the end, he could not pay off the debt and ended up saddled with new debts on the ship. His whereabouts after that are unknown. He is only mentioned once by name in the live-action adaptation.

Mamoru Andō

 is an obese, bespectacled man who ends up fighting alongside Kaiji and Furuhata on the Espoir. Unlike Furuhata, Andō is more opportunistic and tried to backstab the group within minutes of it forming. Furthermore, in the final phase of the game, he is entrusted with rescuing Kaiji, who had fallen into the other room as a strategy to survive, but he was blinded by greed and incited Furuhata to back out of his promise. In order to pay off his debts and make more money, he tries to send Kaiji to hell, but he fails when Kaiji manages to get himself out of the room on his own. Although Andō managed to survive, he had to take on new debts from the ship. His whereabouts after that are unknown.

Although he has not appeared directly in the story since the Ship of Hope arc, he has been burned into Kaiji's mind as a despicable traitor, reappearing in the flashbacks many times.

Kōji Ishida

 is a middle-aged man with a large amount of debt. He is timid and shy, a typical gullible type. He has a wife who is trying to get away from debt collectors and a son who is saddled with debts, and he joins the Espoir to pay back their debts for them, but is tricked by Sakai and sent to the other room. However, Kaiji feels indebted to him as he was the only person on the ship who was earnestly concerned for his life, and rescues him. Later, he participates in a gambling event at the Starside Hotel, where he wins a 10 million yen voucher after crossing the first Human Derby. However, during the second race, Electrified Steel Beam Crossing, he is so scared of death that he cannot take a single step, so he entrusts his voucher to Kaiji to pay off his wife's debt instead. Afterwards, just before Kaiji turned around, he forcibly stifled his screams to avoid agitating Kaiji, and quietly fell off the beam to his death. This would have a great impact on Kaiji's spirit afterwards, admiring Ishida's dignity and how he cared for him and his family to the very end without losing his humanity.

In the live-action adaptation, he teams up with Kaiji on the Espoir and defeats Funai, but in the end, he is unable to survive due to having an extra card, and is sent to an underground forced labor facility along with Kaiji.

Jōji Funai

 is one of the participants on the Espoir. He has thick lips and speaks with a Kansai dialect. A cunning man, he uses his experience of being a repeat participant on the Espoir to con others, such as scamming Kaiji out of two stars, leaving him with a single card and a hopeless situation. Although he showed his actions to be one step ahead of Kaiji and the others until the end of the game, he was momentarily caught off guard by Kaiji, and in the end, his own misunderstanding of the game situation became his fatal injury, and with Kaiji being his only remaining opponent, he was forced to accept Kaiji's challenge to a duel with five stars on the line. His whereabouts after the events are unknown.

In the first live-action movie, just like in the original, he cheats Kaiji out of two stars in the Restricted RPS battle, but when Kaiji noticed his blood on his card during the card shuffle, he loses to Kaiji in a betting game with three stars on the line. As a result of trying to forcefully take the stars back from Kaiji, he is sent to the other room. In the second movie, he was sent to the underground after losing the game on the Espoir, but because of his cleverness, he worked as an agent on the surface just like Tonegawa. He is in charge of facilitating the "Princess and the Slave" gamble in the underworld casino. In order to get revenge, he tries to deceive Kaiji so he can get eaten by the lions, but Kaiji wins the game, and he is sent back to the other room by the blacksuits.

Sugita

He practices the "balance theory" of using Rock, Paper, and Scissors in that exact order every three times he plays, and averaging the remaining cards in his hand so that he can choose between his cards even by the end of the game. He also narrows his tactics down to only dealing with men who have one or two stars left, and is derided by Kaiji as a "hyena" who only targets those weaker than him. After sending two participants to the other room, he challenged Kaiji, who had one star left, to a match. However this was all a ploy by Kaiji, who assumed that his opponent would never use tactics that deviated from the "balance theory", and so ended up losing thrice and winning only once.

Kitami

 is one of the participants on the Espoir. Although he was a first-time participant who did not seem to have gathered any information about the ship in advance, he saw the essence of Restricted RPS and used a variety of strategies. Involving the other two participants, he came up with a tactic of buying up rock cards, but when Kaiji got ahead of him, he quickly changed to a tactic of buying up paper cards. As a result, his teammates took one star from Furuhata and Andō, with the three of them having 12 stars in total. As a finishing touch, he challenged Kaiji to a match to use up all of his extra cards, but Kaiji convinces him to play a match for three stars. He is defeated due to Kaiji figuring out which card he was going to play. Furthermore, he gets into an argument with two of his comrades over who was responsible for the defeat and they split up. The two teammates were easily bribed by Kaiji because they were fed up with Kitami's secretly condescending attitude, so Kitami reluctantly paid 2 million yen to Kaiji to get rid of the cards he had on hand and got out of the game.

Okabayashi

 is one of the participants on the Espoir. He willingly went to the other room on the ship in order to conspire with his friends to carry out a rigged scam. He was once refused to participate because he had too much debt, but he was finally able to get onboard after getting his friends to take on the debt. In the other room, he mocks Ishida and Kaiji for getting betrayed as they hoped that they would be saved despite having nothing to offer in return. He praised Andō and Furuhata's betrayal in front of Kaiji as wise and natural, and taught Kaiji that the only things one can get out of a bond or a friendship are "worthless mementos like souvenirs and travel postcards." He managed to get out of the other room because he had hidden some jewelry in a band-aid on his back, but just before he was about to leave, he was attacked by Kaiji, who saw through it, and in confusion, Kaiji took the jewels and was able to survive as well. It is here when Kaiji understands that, as Okabayashi said, he survived not through bonds and friendship, but through his own power and profit.

Makoto Sahara

 is Kaiji's younger co-worker at a part-time job he found employment at following his survival of the events on the Espoir. His age is presumed to be under 20. Although he dreams of being able to make a big break in life, he does not seem to be putting any effort into it, and he is similar to Kaiji in that he is lazy. He is talkative and frivolous, but in serious games, he shows considerable mental fortitude and athleticism. At the request of Endō, who appears before Kaiji, he participates in the Human Derby gamble sponsored by Teiai and passes the first race in first place. In the second race, while the participants are falling to their deaths one after another, Sahara's own fears of death manifested in a hallucination resembling one of the dead participants. Nevertheless, he pulls himself together and overcomes it, successfully getting on the other side of the bridge. In the end, however, he is blown away and killed by a direct hit from the organizers' trap (a gust of wind caused by the pressure difference between the inside and outside of a skyscraper). The truth of his death has been covered up by the Teiai Group, and officially he died of natural causes, either of illness or sudden death.

Tobaku Hakairoku Kaiji

Yoshihiro Kurosaki

 is one of the top executives of the Teiai Group. After Tonegawa's downfall, he is promoted to the No. 2 position at the organization. While describing Kaiji as a typical "stray dog," he is aware that his fangs have not yet fallen out and appreciates his ability as a gambler. When Kaiji wins a large sum of money in Underground Cee-lo, he is granted special permission to go out (those who have been underground for less than a year may not be allowed to go out prematurely) in order to influence the work ethic of the prisoners who are inspired by the outcome. He also shows concern for his subordinates, such as giving advice and (almost half-threatening) encouragement to Ichijō in the Bog arc. Despite being the No. 2 in Teiai, he has the support of his subordinates because of his consideration for his surroundings without being conceited, and he is essentially a "nice guy" and an outdoorsman. Additionally, at home, he tries to be a good father who cares for his wife and two children, but all three of them suffer because they are rather indoorsy and unpopular. He wants to travel around the country like Kiyoshi Atsumi in It's Tough Being a Man whenever he retires from Teiai.

He also makes an appearance in the spin-off Mr. Tonegawa: Middle Management Blues. He is portrayed as a rival to Tonegawa as someone who, according to Tonegawa, can always point out things that are hard to say without hesitation, and it always leads to a positive response. In the spin-off 1-nichi Gaishutsuroku Hanchō, he is taken to Squad E by Miyamoto and tastes some fermented foods prepared by Numakawa. After enjoying the foods, he takes all of them away with him.

In the live action film "Final Game", he founded a temp agency called Goodwill Industries after appealing directly to Hyōdō, and in just a few years, he has become the leader of the Japanese temp agency industry and is known as "Japan's Dispatch King". He faces off against Kaiji and the others in the Teiai Land game "Last Judgment".

Tarō Ōtsuki

 is the foreman of Squad E to which Kaiji is assigned after being sent to the underground kingdom. In addition to the aides Isawa and Numakawa on his squad, there are about 18 other people in other squads who are under his control. Though he seems like a nice guy who always has a smile on his face and gives newcomers advice on how to get by in the underground kingdom and shows concern for them, he is actually a scumbag who is raking in perica (the currency of the underground kingdom) through ways that do not involve forced labor in order to maintain a more than reasonable position and preferential treatment underground. Behind his smile, he has a vicious side and a cunning nature, which he uses to corrupt, waste, and prey on Kaiji, the Forty-fivers, and other prisoners. Using his skillful control of the minds of the people, he negotiates with his superiors in the underground, where gambling is strictly prohibited, and opens Underground Cee-lo with original rules as a way to relieve stress from the prisoners. But behind the scenes, along with Isawa and Numakawa, they were exploiting large amounts of perica from the prisoners through cheating using four-five-six dice (dice without the numbers 1, 2, or 3 on them), and revising the rules of Cee-lo through the foreman's authority to keep their scam from being exposed. When he works with the two to carry out a scam using the dice, he has Isawa sitting on his left and Numakawa on his right. Eventually, in conjunction with the high sales of luxury goods and the profits from taking a cut of wage advances, he continued to accumulate large sums of money, planning to save up to 20 million perica and buy large numbers of one-day outside passes to enjoy long vacations. However, it is not clear whether he had given up on escaping from the underground, or was content to live there and prey on the weak, as there was no indication that he was ever trying to get out.

After a fierce psychological battle with Kaiji, who noticed the cheating using the special dice, he allowed Kaiji to surprise him, and when all his previous cheating was made public, he was unable to escape due to the intervention of Odagiri and Kurosaki. In the end, Kaiji and the Forty-fivers use rigged dice that can only roll three snake eyes so that Ōtsuki has to pay 5 times the amount bet. This resulted in the biggest defeat in the history of Underground Cee-lo, forcing Ōtsuki to release almost all of the 17,745,000 perica that he had saved up and was only left with some 1,800 perica. Afterwards, it appears that he was stripped of his position as foreman due to the above incident, and when he found out on TV that Kaiji was challenging the Bog, he accused Kaiji of cheating and cursed him to fail (cut in the anime).

He is the main character of the spin-off series 1-nichi Gaishutsuroku Hanchō that takes place before the events of Kaiji, where he is depicted as a gourmet who frequently buys one-day outside passes to taste food and sightsee the outside world.

Kaoru Isawa

He has a handsome physique and a crew cut. He has an oppressive personality and harasses Kaiji and the Forty-fivers so that they cannot have dinner. He sits to Ōtsuki's left and uses the special dice when he and Numakawa work together in the Underground Cee-lo to pull off a 456-dice scam.

He also appears in 1-nichi Gaishutsuroku Hanchō, where he is depicted as enjoying going out for the day with Ōtsuki, and his given name is revealed there for the first time. He has a more feeble appearance in the live-action adaptation.

Takuya Numakawa

 is Ōtsuki's close aide. He has long swept back hair and a mustache. He has a skeptical nature and is wary of Miyoshi's notes. He cannot use the special dice himself, as he serves the role of replacing them with the normal dice in Underground Cee-lo. As a result, he avoids playing big games with large sums of money and often refuses to play the no-limits games, falsely claiming that he is broke.

He also appears in 1-nichi Gaishutsuroku Hanchō, where he is depicted as enjoying going out for the day with Ōtsuki. Like Isawa, his given name is revealed in the spin-off. He also appears as the main character in 1-nichi Koshitsuroku Numakawa, a special one-shot in the first volume of the series.

Tomohiro Miyoshi

 is one of the "Forty-fivers," a group of people paying off their debts by working in the underground labor camps for half-pay. He appears to be of the same age as Kaiji, and despite his timidity, he is easily influenced by his gambling habits and described by Kaiji as "the type most guaranteed to fail in life." Although he meticulously kept a record of all the rolls in cee-lo games, he was not able to take advantage of it in any way. However, it was a big part of Kaiji's realization of Ōtsuki's cheating. He plans to escape from the underground by entrusting Kaiji with all of the approximately 18 million perica that he had gained from his cee-lo match with Ōtsuki, and gets out after Kaiji beats the Bog.

In Tobaku Datenroku Kaiji he works at Takashi Muraoka's casino with Maeda, but ends up in huge debts and offers Kaiji to partner up with them in a gamble. However, in reality, it was a trap to steal an unexpectedly large sum of money from Kaiji, as he believed Muraoka's slanderous claim that Kaiji hoarded the majority of the Bog's winnings that he promised to share with everyone.

He makes a brief appearance in the first two live-action films.

Maeda

 is a worker in group E and a member of the Forty-fivers along with Miyoshi. He is older than Kaiji and more short-tempered, and when he learns of Ōtsuki's cheating, he tries to attack him, but is stopped by Kaiji. He is later released from the underground with the rest of the Forty-fivers.

In Tobaku Datenroku Kaiji he works at Takashi Muraoka's casino with Miyoshi, but ends up in huge debts and offers Kaiji to partner up with them in a gamble.

Kitagawa

 is one of the Forty-fivers, 41 years old. He has narrow eyes and was born in December, and he was worried about joining Kaiji's team to fight against Ōtsuki because of his age, but Kaiji's words made him determined to join. He praises Kaiji's kindness after the victory in Cee-lo. His fate after being freed from the underground is unknown.

Yokoi

 is one of the Forty-fivers. He has thick lips and was first seen drinking and eating while sitting next to Kaiji during Kaiji's first paycheck. His fate after being freed from the underground is unknown.

Hashimoto

 is one of the Forty-fivers. His hair is shaved like Maeda's. He was a little hesitant to join Kaiji's team to fight against Ōtsuki because he only contributed 1,300 perica, but Kaiji's words made him determined to join. His fate after being freed from the underground is unknown.

Hiromitsu Ishida

 is the only son of Kōji Ishida, his age estimated to be early 20s. He is sent underground for his gambling debts and fakes being sick when the labor grows too exhausting. He despises his father for not being able to shoulder his debts, resulting in him being beaten and verbally lacerated by Kaiji, who was there to witness his father's death. Later, however, after failing to make good on his promise to his father to repay his debt, Kaiji is unable to leave Hiromitsu to die, and he is rescued by Kaiji and the Forty-fivers. He thanks Kaiji repeatedly and tells him that he will work hard this time. His whereabouts after he was released from the underground are unknown. In the anime adaptation, there is an additional scene where he witnesses Kaiji's beating of the Bog on TV and tearfully tells his late father that Kaiji's strength was as real as his father said it would be.

In the live-action film version, he was changed to a woman named Hiromi Ishida, a name that belonged to Ishida's wife in the original manga.

Odagiri

 is the foreman of Squad C in the underground kingdom, and is best friends with Squad B foreman Iwata and Squad A foreman Sakai. In the final battle between Kaiji and Ōtsuki, when Ōtsuki was caught cheating and tried to take away the evidence of the scam from Kaiji, he offered to examine the evidence and was neutral and calm throughout, acknowledging Kaiji's measures in response to the cheating based on the earlier interactions.

In 1-nichi Gaishutsuroku Hanchō, he appears as Ōtsuki's rival. He dreams of opening an underground cinema, and earns perica to pay for tablets and movie downloads to screen films underground.

Kōtarō Sakazaki

 is Kaiji's collaborator in the beating of the Bog. He is 52 years old and though his birthplace is unknown, he occasionally sprinkles his speech with a Kansai dialect (in the live-action film version, he speaks in a fully Kansai dialect). He used to work as a site supervisor for a major general contractor, but when the recession hit, he left the company voluntarily. After that, he spent his days idly playing pachinko, and when his wife and daughter got tired of him, they divorced. In doing so, he disposed of his savings and assets, and from then on, he worked as a night watchman and lived in a poor apartment. In order to get back together with his family, he plans to use 20 million yen in war funds to beat the Bog and runs into Kaiji, who has been temporarily freed from the underground kingdom. After beating the Bog, he earns about 150 million yen and vows to quit gambling, choosing to cling tightly to the happiness of every day he can spend with his family.

In Tobaku Datenroku Kaiji, he returns to his wife and daughter by purchasing a luxury house for 130 million yen, and invites Kaiji to the house on New Year's Day. However, he is fed up with the fact that Kaiji has been living a life of self-indulgence without working for 50 days, so he gives Kaiji severance money of 3 million yen and throws him out. He has a daughter, Mikoko, who looks just like him, but Sakazaki thinks she is extraordinarily beautiful and is on guard day and night to make sure she does not get any undesirable lovers. The reason he kicked Kaiji out of the house was because he was afraid of Kaiji and Mikoko developing a relationship (though from Kaiji's point of view, this worked out as he desired).

Seiya Ichijō

 is the young manager of an underworld casino with a human-eating pachinko called "The Bog." He is 25 years old, takes care of his personal appearance and has a neat face. Though he had high academic ability in high school, for some complicated reason, he gave up on going to college and took a job at a casino affiliated with the Teiai Group, where he was promoted to casino store manager after seven years of servant work. He is an executive candidate who is under the eye of Teiai's no. 2 Kurosaki, and in order to get back at his high school classmates who once looked down on him, he aspires to become an executive in the Teiai Group after the death of Chairman Hyōdō, and has endured Hyōdō's insidious bullying. He shows his talents numerous times, such as when he sees through Sakazaki's acting and quickly notices Kaiji's tricks and traps while the other casino members are unaware of them. Although he dislikes Chairman Hyōdō's humanity, he admits that his words and thoughts strike at the truth of the world. After Kaiji beats the Bog, Hyōdō, who had been watching the game from start to finish, furiously condemns Ichijō to an underground prison sentence of 1050 years (calculated as 15 years of incarceration per 10 million) to compensate for the damage of releasing the Bog's ball savings to the public. As he is dragged away from the casino, Kaiji encourages him to crawl back up and take revenge on him, which Ichijō tearfully vows to do.

The live-action adaptation gives Ichijō additional backstory in which he is tricked by a friend into being a cosigner for a debt and sent underground, and that he is the survivor of the Brave Men Road (Steel Frame Crossing) gamble, like Kaiji. In Ichijō's case, however, he has seen his friends that he met underground cursing and betraying each other in said gamble, and as a result, he has come to distrust humanity and he personally regards Kaiji, who is trying to save his friends, as a hypocrite. As a result, his desire for a decisive battle using the Bog becomes more apparent, making him even more of a rival to Kaiji. In the end, his defeat caused a great deal of damage to Teiai, so he was sanctioned at Kurosaki's behest for 1035 years of underground labor and taken away from the casino.

Tobaku Datenroku Kaiji

Takashi Muraoka
 is the president of an underworld casino affiliated with the Teiai Group, he is the inventor of the anomalous two-player mahjong game "17 Steps." A greedy, unmarried mammonist who believes only in the money put out in front of him, without the virtues and ideas of friendship and trust, he is determined to achieve a more solid success in every aspect of his life, and is willing to break the law to do so. Although he is evading taxes due to his position as an underworld casino manager, he eventually realizes that he has no choice but to pay "a shit-ton of royalties" in the form of tax refunds to Teiai, internally cursing at Hyōdō and calling him a "devil lord." He hates risk, and has earned large sums of money by letting his subordinates (Maeda when playing against Kaiji) guide him with coded signs, as he does not want to go into a game unless he has a perfectly good chance of winning. Though he is for the most part a cowardly and petty scoundrel, like Kaiji, he is a gambler who shows his talent when he is cornered, such as when he can suddenly come up with a strategy that goes beyond the norm and uses his cheating without letting anyone see it coming. He is also a master at seducing and inciting people's minds as a con artist, such as making Miyoshi and Maeda, who had previously admired Kaiji, turn against him, and has been described by Kaiji as being able to start a bogus religion. In the end, however, Kaiji takes advantage of his inclination to win by having fun with no risk, and defeats him. He is last seen in the Kazuya Arc, cursing at Miyoshi and Maeda and threatening to kill himself.

Mikoko Sakazaki
 is the beloved 20-year-old daughter of Kōtarō Sakazaki and looks almost identical to her father. She is in love with Kaiji and is quite assertive, inviting him to go to the park and other places, and often bewilders Kaiji by sleeping on his lap or hanging off his arm. While Kaiji was living at the Sakazakis' place, she would occasionally give him 2,000-3,000 yen along with pocket money, which he would then waste on pachinko. She is last seen in the Kazuya Arc where she drew a manga called "Ikaji", which is modeled after herself, Kaiji, and their relationship. According to the content of the manga, she seems to understand the self-indulgent side of Kaiji. However, she tends to be a bit presumptuous, and she cannot read Kaiji's mind when it comes to love. In the previous arc she only appears in a family photograph and Sakazaki's flashbacks, but in the anime adaptation she also appears in the ending theme (which is based on the first chapter of this arc) and the last episode as a background character.

Kazuya Hyōdō
 is the second son of Kazutaka Hyōdō, with his age estimated to be around 18. He is often referred to as "young master" by those involved in the Teiai Group. He is of foreign descent, with a host-like appearance sporting brown hair and sunglasses. His personality may be considered sadistic like his father's, which he partially denies. During the 17 Steps game, after Kaiji loses all of his money he keeps loaning him so he can continue to gamble; however, he tells Kaiji that if he cannot repay the debt, he will either be sent back to the underground labor camp or have his body parts removed (which body part will be removed is determined by a lottery wheel). He shows his age-appropriate side by expressing his displeasure with Kaiji's harsh remarks in an understandable way, and nodding in honest admiration when he learns that the remarks were a part of Kaiji's strategy. He also possesses a certain calmness and composure, as he remains neutral until the end of a game when judging a situation or watching from the sidelines, regardless of whether it involves a family member or stranger. He prefers not to show the gap between the rich and the poor with the people he associates with and behaves in a frank manner, especially with those he likes. He then reveals to Kaiji that he detests the life he leads, and claims to not know true friendship or love, as everyone he meets kisses up to him due to the influence of his father. As a result, he has grown skeptical, is blind to people's hearts, has tasted loneliness and emptiness, and after being betrayed by everyone he once considered a friend, he can no longer believe in the goodness and beauty of people, and in fact believes human beings are naturally detestable and likely to betray others. Eventually, under the name "Kazuya Produce," he began to lure major debtors and sometimes classmates into gambling, with a prize of 10 million yen for the winner and the punishment of death for the loser, and he finds no issue in wasting money for his schemes, instead wanting to be an author. Later, as a means of finding out if true bonds actually exist, he sets up a series of deadly games such as the Salvation Game that are designed to test the bonds between people, which influence the ideas for his novels. After the unexpected outcome of the Salvation Game, he invites Kaiji to a game of One Poker, and is soundly defeated in a situation where both parties had an equal chance of dying. Though he was saved by Kaiji at the last minute and merely fainted from the fall, his current status is unknown.

Mario Garcia
 is a young Filipino who worked under Mitsuyama and is the youngest of the three, with his age being around 20. He participated in Kazuya's Salvation Game to help Mitsuyama pay off his debts. He comes from a family of scavengers at the bottom of the poverty line and made his living in the "Smoky Valley," a sea of garbage. He has an aversion to money after his older brother Antonio's incident, but also hopes to carve out a future for himself. After being betrayed and nearly killed by Mitsuyama, he became Kaiji's companion along with Chang, and together they set out to defeat Kazuya. He usually has a calm personality and can adjust to his surroundings despite having a bit of a weak side, but in the 2.4 Billion Escape Arc, he showed his courage and tact by snatching someone's bag on the spur of the moment in order to avoid being questioned by the police.

Chang Bowen
 is a young man coming from a poor rural area in China. Like Mario, he worked under Mitsuyama and participated in Kazuya's Salvation Game to help Mitsuyama pay off his debts. He was the second son, but due to the Chinese government's one-child policy, he was unregistered and led a working life without being treated as a human being. After being betrayed and almost killed by Mitsuyama, he became Kaiji's companion along with Mario, and together they set out to defeat Kazuya. He is normally calm and the more tactful of the three, but he sometimes becomes emotional and even gets into an argument with the blacksuit Takasaki during One Poker. In the 2.4 Billion Escape Arc, he is the only license carrier among the three, so he is the driver of the getaway car.

Mitsuyama
 is a middle-aged man with a barely sustainable business who employed Chang and Mario. His age is over 40 and was a multiple debtor, but because he was suffering from hepatitis B, he was deemed unable to sell his organs and was almost sent underground, but Kazuya bought him out of custody for 10 million and he agreed to participate in Kazuya's Salvation Game with Chang and Mario. Since he has a lot of life experience, he is flexible enough to accept a frame-up if necessary. The trio vowed to complete the game, but in the final stages, Kazuya's machinations caused him to fall into intense disbelief, and in the end he chose the path of leaving Chang and Mario behind and winning about 70 million yen for himself. In the 2.4 Billion Escape Arc, he runs into Chang and Mario at an apartment while picking up his belongings and tries to give them one million yen each as a parting gift, but his performative gestures and humanity is thoroughly reviled and scorned by them.

Takeshi Arima
 is the owner of the "Center of the Earth" car dealership in Ibaraki Prefecture. He recalls how he used to be an office worker who endured continuous power harassment from his superiors, as well as experiencing a life of homelessness. Due to going through countless bitter moments in his life, he developed an eccentric personality. When Kaiji's group visits his store to rent a car and willingly offers 1.5 million yen for it, an amount of money that would let them purchase a car outright, he initially mistakes them for suicidal people, but supports them in their future and ends up lending them a camper van.

Hatsue Itō
 is Kaiji's mother. She lives in an apartment complex and works part-time five times a week at a supermarket in the neighborhood. Her eyes look exactly like her son's, but she is a natural airhead. On the good side, she is good-natured, an aspect which has been passed down to Kaiji, but on the bad side, she is thoughtless and does not know how to be suspicious of people. She is a doting parent and sweet to Kaiji.

Tamotsu Takahashi
 is Kaiji's childhood friend who went to the same elementary and middle school as him. He works as manager of a diner and is a serious young man who works overtime on his days off and commutes to work on his motorcycle.

Nanae Takahashi
 is Tamotsu's mother. When Kaiji escaped from the apartment complex, she acted as a decoy.

Nakasaka
 is a man Kaiji runs into at a bank in Ibaraki Prefecture during his "Nationwide Savings Trip". He is divorced, and shortly after his wife's divorce, he visited the bank to divide up his property. The flyer he received from Teiai revealed that the bounty was on Kaiji's group's head, and he later found out that they were hiding out in Ibaraki Prefecture when he reported the matter to Teiai, who then found out it was indeed Kaiji.

Hiroki Ishitaka
 is a middle-aged man that Kaiji's group encounters at a motor home campground that they had chosen as a safe place to sleep during their "Nationwide Savings Trip." He and his friend  invite Kaiji's group, who were holed up in the car, to have a drink. Afterwards, he helps Kaiji's group to fend off Inokuma's pursuit. He lives with his parents, who run a signboard shop, but they do not seem to get along very well with each other.

Takeshi Inokuma
 is a man who owns a Mazda MX-5 and is encountered by Kaiji's group at the parking lot of a convenience store. He is 44 years old and a debtor to Teiai, and when he suspects that Kaiji's group is the trio of people shown on the wanted flyer he received from Teiai, he begins to track down their camper-van.

Kaiji: Final Game

Kanako Kirino

 is one of the main characters in the film. She was the winner of the second relief event in Osaka and is a self-proclaimed "lucky girl" who was recruited by Tōgō for her luck. She is younger than Kaiji, but speaks to him informally.

Kōsuke Takakura

 is the largest enemy in the film. A former bureaucrat in the Ministry of Economy, Trade and Industry, he currently serves as Principal Secretary to the Prime Minister and is known as "Shadow Prime Minister". His "Gold Rock-Paper-Scissors" game played for entertainment purpose is well-known among those in power. To stop Japan's rapid economic decline, he plans to implement a "deposit blockade" and use the people's assets to offset the national debt.

Minato Hirose

 is Tōgō's secretary and one of the main characters in the film. He has been Tōgō's secretary for three years and asks Kaiji and Kanako to help him gamble with his plan to save Japan, as Tōgō has little time left to live.

Shigeru Tōgō

 is a man who has been called "Japan's Real Estate King." He has a fortune of 50 billion yen, but with little time left to live, he wanted to serve Japan as much as possible in his remaining life span, so he held a relief event. After leaving his wife he got a lover, but one day he suddenly abandoned her and her son. He learns that the government is about to implement a "deposit blockade" and asks Kaiji and Kanako, the winners of the relief event, to help him gamble in order to stop it.

References

Kaiji